This is a list of the extreme points of Iceland, the points that are farther north, south, east or west than any other location.

Iceland (country)

 Northernmost point — Kolbeinsey, Eyjafjörður
 Northernmost settlement — Grímsey, Eyjafjörður
 Southernmost point — Surtsey, Vestmannaeyjar
 Southernmost settlement (farm) — Garðar, Vestur-Skaftafellssýsla (63°24'N, 019°03'W)
 Southernmost settlement (town) — Vík, Vestur-Skaftafellssýsla (63°25'N, 019°01'W)
 Westernmost point — Bjargtangar, Vestur-Barðastrandarsýsla
 Westernmost settlement (farm) — Hvallátur, Vestur-Barðastrandarsýsla (65°32'N, 024°28'W)
 Westernmost settlement (town) — Patreksfjörður, Vestur-Barðastrandarsýsla (65°35'N, 23°59'W)
 Easternmost point — Hvalbakur, Suður-Múlasýsla
 Easternmost settlement (farm) — Sandvík, Suður-Múlasýsla (65°06'N, 013°33'W)
 Easternmost settlement (town) — Neskaupstaður (65°09'N, 13°43'W)

Iceland (mainland Iceland)

 Northernmost point — Rifstangi, Norður-Þingeyjarsýsla (66°32'N, 016°12'W)
 Northernmost settlement (farm) — Rif, Norður-Þingeyjarsýsla (66°32'N, 016°12'W)
 Northernmost settlement (town) — Raufarhöfn, Norður-Þingeyjarsýsla (66°27'N, 015°57'W)
 Southernmost point — Kötlutangi, Vestur-Skaftafellssýsla (63°23'N, 018°45'W)
 Southernmost settlement (farm) — Garðar, Vestur-Skaftafellssýsla (63°24'N, 019°03'W)
 Southernmost settlement (town) — Vík, Vestur-Skaftafellssýsla (63°25'N, 019°01'W)
 Westernmost point — Bjargtangar, Vestur-Barðastrandarsýsla (65°30'N, 024°32'W)
 Westernmost settlement (farm) — Hvallátur, Vestur-Barðastrandarsýsla (65°32'N, 024°28'W)
 Westernmost settlement (town) — Patreksfjörður, Vestur-Barðastrandarsýsla (65°35'N, 023°59'W)
 Easternmost point — Gerpir, Suður-Múlasýsla (65°04'N, 013°29'W)
 Easternmost settlement (farm) — Sandvík, Suður-Múlasýsla (65°06'N, 013°33'W)
 Easternmost settlement (town) — Neskaupstaður (65°09'N, 013°43'W)

Altitude
 Highest point — Hvannadalshnúkur,
 Lowest point — Atlantic Ocean, 
 Highest village — Möðrudalur,

See also

 Geography of Iceland
 Extreme points of Earth
 

Geography of Iceland
Iceland
Extreme